The Billings Refinery is an oil refinery located in Billings, Montana. The refinery is currently owned and operated by Phillips 66. It is capable of producing 450 million gallons of gasoline per year.

See also
List of oil refineries
Phillips 66

References

External links
 Phillips 66 website

Buildings and structures in Billings, Montana
Energy infrastructure completed in 1947
Energy infrastructure in Montana
Oil refineries in the United States
Phillips 66
1947 establishments in Montana